Alberto Marcos Rey (born 15 February 1974) is a Spanish retired footballer who played as a left back.

After not being able to establish himself at Real Madrid, he went to play for 15 professional seasons with Valladolid, experiencing two relegations and one promotion and appearing in nearly 500 competitive matches.

Club career
Marcos was born in Camarma de Esteruelas, Community of Madrid. After emerging through the ranks of Real Madrid he played three La Liga matches for the 1995 national champions, his debut coming on 17 April 1994 in a 1–0 away win over Sevilla FC. In a subsequent game against FC Barcelona, he effectively marked Bulgarian international Hristo Stoichkov, but could never break into the first team.

In the 1995–96 season, Marcos signed with Real Valladolid, going on to be a defensive mainstay for over a decade, amassing nearly 500 appearances in all competitions and eventually gaining team captaincy. From 1997 to 2002 he only missed a total of eight league fixtures, and became, late in 2008–09, the player with most overall and first division matches for the club. Two seasons earlier, as the Castile and León side returned to the top division after a two-year absence, he had contributed 29 matches, scoring once.

Marcos suffered with various injuries the following campaign, and appeared in only 21 league games whilst completing just 12, his third worst input in 15 years with Valladolid. In July 2010, at 36 – and following the team's relegation – he decided to leave the club, holding the records of more league games played (438), more official matches (471) and more games (361) and minutes (31.610) in the top flight.

Late into the month, Marcos signed with SD Huesca of the second division, reuniting with former Valladolid coach Onésimo Sánchez. He was the undisputed starter in his position during the season as the Aragonese retained their league status, and retired from football in June 2011 to become Valladolid's director of football.

References

External links

1974 births
Living people
Footballers from Madrid
Spanish footballers
Association football defenders
La Liga players
Segunda División players
Segunda División B players
Real Madrid C footballers
Real Madrid Castilla footballers
Real Madrid CF players
Real Valladolid players
SD Huesca footballers
Spain under-21 international footballers